Sri Lanka made its Paralympic Games début at the 1996 Summer Paralympics in Atlanta, with a single athlete (Kalika Pathirana) in track and field. The country has participated in every subsequent edition of the Summer Paralympics, but has never entered the Winter Paralympics.

At the 2012 Summer Paralympics in London, Sri Lanka won their first Paralympic medal through Pradeep Sanjaya, who won the Bronze medal in the Men's 400 metres T46.

At the 2016 Summer Paralympics in Rio,  Sri Lanka won a bronze. Dinesh Priyantha Herath was placed 3rd in the men’s javelin throw F46 final.

At the 2020 Summer Paralympics in Tokyo, Sri Lanka won its first ever Paralympics gold medal, with Dinesh Priyantha Herath taking gold in the men's javelin throw F46 category, setting a new F46 world & paralympic record of 67.79 metres. Dulan Kodithuwakku also claimed the bronze medal in the men's javelin throw F64 category at the 2020 Tokyo Paralympics, with a distance of 65.61 metres.

Both Sanjaya and Priyantha have served in the Sri Lanka Army.

Medal table

List of medalists

See also
 Sri Lanka at the Olympics

References